Hassan Olawale Adams (born June 20, 1984) is an American former professional basketball player. He played college basketball for Arizona.

High school career
Adams attended Westchester High School in Westchester, Los Angeles, where he averaged 18 points, 5 rebounds and 3 assists while leading his team to a 32–2 record, the California State Division I-A Championship, and a USA Today No. 1 ranking in his senior year. A McDonald's All-American and second team Parade All-America pick. Named California Mr. Basketball, the first guard to receive the honor since Baron Davis in 1997.

Collegiate career
Adams played collegiately at the University of Arizona from 2002 to 2006. Adams played primarily at the small forward position under coach Lute Olson and wore number 21 throughout his collegiate career. He was named All-Pac-10 First Team in 2006.

Professional career
In the 2006 NBA draft, Adams was selected by the New Jersey Nets in the second round with the 54th pick. In pre-draft workouts, Adams was injured after Texas forward P. J. Tucker stepped on his foot. Adams made the Nets roster and in his rookie year and started eight games, finishing with 61 played games that season. He scored his first points on November 24. On November 29, 2006, Adams scored a career-high 16 points against the Boston Celtics in 23 minutes of playing time. On July 14, 2007, the Nets waived Adams.

Adams worked out with the Cleveland Cavaliers and played in three preseason games for the Cavs, averaging 2.7 ppg, 0.7 rpg and 0.3 apg in 6.3 mpg. On October 27, 2007, the Cavs waived him.

On July 1, 2008, Adams signed a two-year contract with the Toronto Raptors after attending the team's free-agent camp.

On January 7, 2009, Adams was traded to the Los Angeles Clippers along with cash considerations for a future conditional second-round pick. He was quickly waived by the Clippers, and signed with KK Vojvodina Srbijagas shortly after.

In 2011, Adams played in the Philippine Basketball Association as an import for the Rain or Shine Elasto Painters during the 2011 PBA Commissioner's Cup.

In July 2014, he signed with the Singapore Slingers for the 2014 ABL season.

On October 12, 2015, Adams signed with the upcoming AmeriLeague, however, the league folded after it was discovered the founder was a con-artist.

NBA career statistics

Regular season

|-
| style="text-align:left;"|
| style="text-align:left;"|New Jersey
| 61 || 8 || 8.1 || .556 || .000 || .667 || 1.3 || .2 || .3 || .1 || 2.9
|-
| style="text-align:left;"|
| style="text-align:left;"|Toronto
| 12 || 0 || 4.3 || .308 ||  || .500 || .6 || .1 || .1 || .1 || .9
|- class="sortbottom"
| style="text-align:center;" colspan="2"|Career
| 73 || 8 || 7.5 || .534 || .000 || .643 || 1.2 || .2 || .2 || .1 || 2.5

Playoffs

|-
| style="text-align:left;"|2007
| style="text-align:left;"|New Jersey
| 6 || 0 || 1.5 || .500 ||  ||  || .2 || .0 || .0 || .0 || .3
|- class="sortbottom"
| style="text-align:center;" colspan="2"|Career
| 6 || 0 || 1.5 || .500 ||  ||  || .2 || .0 || .0 || .0 || .3

References

External links

Legabasket.it Profile
Eurobasket.com Profile
Arizona Wildcats Bio
Hassan Adams Player Card

1984 births
Living people
American expatriate basketball people in Canada
American expatriate basketball people in Italy
American expatriate basketball people in Serbia
American expatriate basketball people in the Philippines
American expatriate basketball people in Venezuela
Arizona Wildcats men's basketball players
Basketball players from Los Angeles
KK Vojvodina Srbijagas players
McDonald's High School All-Americans
New Jersey Nets draft picks
New Jersey Nets players
Parade High School All-Americans (boys' basketball)
Philippine Basketball Association imports
Rain or Shine Elasto Painters players
Small forwards
Basketball players from Inglewood, California
Teramo Basket players
Toronto Raptors players
Westchester High School (Los Angeles) alumni
American men's basketball players